In Big Trouble is a book written by Laura Lippman and published by Avon Books (owned by HarperCollins) in 1999, which later went on to win the Anthony Award for Best Paperback Original in 2000.

References 

Anthony Award-winning works
American mystery novels
1999 American novels
Avon (publisher) books